When The Legends Die is a 1963 American novel, written by Hal Borland; and a 1972 American Western film released  in DeLuxe Color by Twentieth Century-Fox.

Novel
The novel, about the life of a Ute Indian young man, was written in 1963 by Hal Borland. While it was written as a mainstream novel, it became a young adult classic. The novel is roughly divided into four parts: Tom Black Bull's youth with his parents who lived "off the reservation" in the wilderness of southern Colorado; Tom's experience as an orphan sent to the reservation school against his will; Tom's "abandonment" of the Indian lifestyle and his success on the rodeo circuit in Colorado, New Mexico, Texas and Oklahoma; and finally Tom's return to his roots — reconciling himself with his heritage and his solitary relationship with the land and the wilderness.

Film
The film was made in 1972, starring Richard Widmark and Frederic Forrest. It was directed by Stuart Millar from a screenplay written by Robert Dozier. It was freely adapted from the novel, updating the action from the start of the 20th century to the present, and cutting out the majority of the original plot, effectively based on only one middle section of the novel.

The title is taken from the saying "When the legends die the dreams end, when the dreams end there is no more greatness."

The film had a budget of $1,520,000.

Plot
A Ute Indian youth, Tom Black Bull (Frederic Forrest), leaves the reservation to enter the rodeo life. He is under the tutelage of Red Dillon (Richard Widmark), a talented man with a drinking problem. The youth deals with the struggle between two worlds and deciding what life has to offer.

Cast
 Richard Widmark as Red Dillon
 Frederic Forrest as Tom Black Bull
 Luana Anders as Mary
 Vito Scotti as Meo (Dillon's caretaker)
 Herbert Nelson as Dr. Wilson
 John War Eagle as Blue Elk
 John Gruber as Clyde 'Tex' Walker
 Garry Walberg as School Superintendent
 Jack Mullaney as Gas Station Attendant
 Malcolm Curley as Benny Grayback (school principal)
 Roy Engel as Sam Turner
 Rex Holman as Neil Swenson
 Mel Gallagher as Cowboy
 Tillman Box as Young Tom Black Bull
 Sondra Pratt as Angie (girl who picks up Tom)

References

External links
 
 
 
 

1972 films
1972 Western (genre) films
American Western (genre) films
1963 American novels
American novels adapted into films
J. B. Lippincott & Co. books
Rodeo in film
1970s English-language films
1970s American films